In numerical linear algebra, the biconjugate gradient stabilized method, often abbreviated as BiCGSTAB, is an iterative method developed by H. A. van der Vorst for the numerical solution of nonsymmetric linear systems. It is a variant of the biconjugate gradient method (BiCG) and has faster and smoother convergence than the original BiCG as well as other variants such as the conjugate gradient squared method (CGS). It is a Krylov subspace method. Unlike the original BiCG method, it doesn't require multiplication by the transpose of the system matrix.

Algorithmic steps

Unpreconditioned BiCGSTAB
To solve a linear system , BiCGSTAB starts with an initial guess  and proceeds as follows:

 
 Choose an arbitrary vector  such that , e.g.,  .   denotes the dot product of vectors 
 
 
 For 
 
 
 
 
 
 
 If  is accurate enough, then set  and quit
 
 
 
 
 If  is accurate enough, then quit

Preconditioned BiCGSTAB
Preconditioners are usually used to accelerate convergence of iterative methods. To solve a linear system  with a preconditioner , preconditioned BiCGSTAB starts with an initial guess  and proceeds as follows:

 
 Choose an arbitrary vector  such that , e.g., 
 
 
 For 
 
 
 
 
 
 
 
 If  is accurate enough then  and quit
 
 
 
 
 
 If  is accurate enough then quit
 

This formulation is equivalent to applying unpreconditioned BiCGSTAB to the explicitly preconditioned system

In other words, both left- and right-preconditioning are possible with this formulation.

Derivation

BiCG in polynomial form

,
,
,
.

,

,
.

It is straightforward to show that

,
,
,

These polynomials satisfy the following recurrence relations:

,
.

Derivation of BiCGSTAB from BiCG
It is unnecessary to explicitly keep track of the residuals and search directions of BiCG. In other words, the BiCG iterations can be performed implicitly. In BiCGSTAB, one wishes to have recurrence relations for

,

This can also be derived from the BiCG relations:

.

Similarly to defining , BiCGSTAB defines

.

,
.

.

The recurrence relation for  can then be written as

,

which corresponds to

.

Determination of BiCGSTAB constants

In BiCG,  with

.

However, it can be related to the scalar

.

It follows that

,

and thus

.

A simple formula for  can be similarly derived. In BiCG,

.

It happens that  and  have the same leading coefficient.

.

This is achieved when

,

giving the optimal value

.

Generalization
BiCGSTAB can be viewed as a combination of BiCG and GMRES where each BiCG step is followed by a GMRES() (i.e., GMRES restarted at each step) step to repair the irregular convergence behavior of CGS, as an improvement of which BiCGSTAB was developed. However, due to the use of degree-one minimum residual polynomials, such repair may not be effective if the matrix  has large complex eigenpairs. In such cases, BiCGSTAB is likely to stagnate, as confirmed by numerical experiments.

One may expect that higher-degree minimum residual polynomials may better handle this situation. This gives rise to algorithms including BiCGSTAB2 and the more general BiCGSTAB(). In BiCGSTAB(), a GMRES() step follows every  BiCG steps.

See also
 Biconjugate gradient method
 Conjugate gradient squared method
 Conjugate gradient method

References
 
 
 
 

Numerical linear algebra
Gradient methods
Articles with example pseudocode